Ruda Milicka  is a village in the administrative district of Gmina Milicz, within Milicz County, Lower Silesian Voivodeship, in south-western Poland. As of the census of 2011, the village has a population of 146.

References

Ruda Milicka